Length of War is a 1976 Mexican drama film directed by Gonzalo Martínez Ortega. The film was selected as the Mexican entry for the Best Foreign Language Film at the 49th Academy Awards, but was not accepted as a nominee.

Cast
 Víctor Alcocer
 José Luis Almada
 Mario Almada
 Pedro Armendáriz Jr.
 Fernando Balzaretti
 Elsa Benn
 Narciso Busquets
 Roberto Cañedo
 Armando Coria
 Pancho Córdova
 Eugenia D'Silva
 Ángel de la Peña García
 Alma Delfina
 Lucía Guilmáin

See also
 List of submissions to the 49th Academy Awards for Best Foreign Language Film
 List of Mexican submissions for the Academy Award for Best Foreign Language Film

References

External links
 

1976 films
1970s Spanish-language films
1976 drama films
Films directed by Gonzalo Martínez Ortega
Mexican drama films
1970s Mexican films